The wildlife of Vietnam is rich in flora and fauna as reflected by its unique biodiversity. Rare and endemic antelope-like animal, categorized under the bovine subfamily, was found in 1992, in Bạch Mã National Park. In the 1990s, three other large mammal species, the deer-like Truong Son muntjac, giant muntjac and Pu Hoat muntjac, were also discovered, the first two in the same park.  Conservation protection and scientific studies of the ecology of Vietnam, particularly in the protected forest areas, have been given priority attention by the Government of Vietnam. Laws were enacted to set up Xuân Thủy Wetland National Park, four UNESCO Biosphere Reserves, and Hạ Long Bay and Phong Nha-Kẻ Bàng National Parks; the last two are also designated as UNESCO World Heritage Sites.

The rich diversity of Vietnam's wildlife includes 11,400 species of vascular plants, 1030 species of moss, 310 species of mammals, 296 reptile species, 162 amphibian species, 700 freshwater species of fish and 2000 species of marine fish. There are about 889 species of birds and over 850 species of land mollusks. However, a study by the WWF has reported that nearly 10% of the wildlife in the country is threatened with extinction. Vietnam is placed 16th highest among 152 countries studied in terms of the proportion of its wildlife species found to be in danger.

National parks

While the national reserves cover small areas of scientific significance with restricted access, the national parks also cover wetlands of Ramsar designated areas and BirdLife International inscribed bird areas. The largest of the national parks initially covered were the Cuc Phuong National Park, the Cat Tien National Park, the Con Dao National Park and Con Dao National Park, which to start with, were forest areas cum reserves or prohibited areas. The objective for creating national parks was to allow access to the reserved areas as a part of ecotourism and cultural needs with full attention to the basic approach of conservation of natural environmental resources.

The national parks and reserves, as per present status, (as reported by the national parks of Vietnam) conforming to the topography of the country which cover terrestrial, deltas of rivers, and coastal zones are: Five national parks and four reserves in the Mekong Delta; two national parks in the northeastern area; five reserves in the north western area; three parks in the Red River Delta; two parks and one reserve in the North Central Coastal area; two reserves in South Central Coastal area; three parks and one reserve in Central Highlands; one park and one reserve in south eastern area.

Flora
The flora of Vietnam has existed in its current form since at least the Oligocene, as evidenced by the assemblage known as the Ha Long megafossil flora from the Oligocene-aged Dong Ho Formation, which outcrops in the Ha Long region.

The country was once totally covered with forests but over the years due to the war and deforestation and anthropological pressures some areas have lost their biodiversity value. The floral richness of the rain forest habitats comprise a broad range of evergreens. According to the  Conservation International List Vietnam is identified as the fifth biodiversity hot spot in the world, on account of its exotic flora and fauna. Between 1997 and 2007, almost 1000 new species have been discovered. However, many areas still remain to be explored, and more species are likely to appear in the future. Natural forests are at higher elevations in the northwest and mangrove swamps are in the coastal areas. Rainforest in the hilly region has wild rhododendrons in the northwest along with dwarf bamboos and numerous types of orchids. The central dry region has pines and the river deltas have mangrove forests. The largest and the most conspicuous find in recent years is of the plant species in the Halong Bay area known as Halong fan palm. The largest species was the gum tree.

Considered one of the world biological diversification centers, the flora estimated is of the order of 12,000 species (veined flora) of which 9,628 have been recorded under 291 families. It includes 1000 endemic species. Trees, which provide timber, are of 1,000 species. Timber plants are 100 species. Commercially usable species are 352 species including 42 listed as precious tree species. Further categorization of the flora relates to 76 aromatic spices, 160 species providing vegetable oils, and also herbal species. Some of the well known herbal species are: ginseng, Coscinium fenestratum, Coptis teeta, Panax vietnamensis, Stephania spp.

Fauna

Faunal species noted are accounted as 11,217 species of animals, in Vietnam's hot and humid climate. These are broadly: Indian elephants, bears (black bear and honey bear), Indochinese tigers and Indochinese leopards as well as smaller animals like pygmy lorises, monkeys (such as snub-nosed monkey), bats, flying squirrels, turtles and otters. Reptiles such as crocodiles, snakes and lizards are also reported. Specifically the faunal species which are endemic to Vietnam are the following. While many variety of animals have become extinct like the Northern Sumatran rhinoceros, the protection of large animals have been addressed. The Vietnamese Javan rhinoceros used to live throughout the region of Vietnam but was declared extinct in 2010 when the last remaining individual was found dead with the horn removed.

There are also 2,470 species of fish, more than 23,000 species of corals and many species of invertebrates recorded in the wildlife of Vietnam.

Mammals

Primates

Hatinh langur
Francois' Langur
Black-crested gibbon
White-cheeked gibbon
Southern white-cheeked gibbon
Red-shanked douc
Black-shanked douc
Gray-shanked douc
Tonkin snub-nosed monkey
Stump-tailed macaque
Pygmy loris

Crab-eating macaque
Pig-tailed macaque

Cats
Indochinese tiger
Leopard cat
Marbled cat
Jungle cat
Clouded leopard
Asian golden cat
Indochinese leopard

Civets
Large Indian civet
Large-spotted civet
Small Indian civet
Owston's palm civet
Asian palm civet
Binturong
Masked palm civet
Small-toothed palm civet

Deer
Giant muntjac
Indian muntjac
Truong Son muntjac
Vietnamese sika deer
Sambar deer

Elephants
Indian elephant

Bovine
Banteng
Kouprey
Saola
Gaur
Water buffalo

Rhinoceros
Northern Sumatran rhinoceros which is officially extinct in Vietnam and on the IUCN Red List.
Vietnamese Javan rhinoceros which is officially extinct in Vietnam and on the IUCN Red List.

Cetacea
Chinese white dolphin
Finless porpoise (Narrow-ridged finless porpoise)
Irrawaddy dolphin
Spinner dolphin

Sirenia
Dugong

Reptiles

Turtles/Tortoises
Elongated tortoise Indotestudo elongata
Vietnamese pond turtle Mauremys annamensis
Asian forest tortoise Manouria emys
Green sea turtle Chelonia mydas
Hawksbill turtle Eretmochelys imbricata
Leatherback sea turtle Dermochelys coriacea
Asian giant softshell turtle Pelochelys cantorii
Yangtze giant softshell turtle Rafetus swinhoei

Lizards

Agamids
Chinese water dragon Physignathus cocincinus
Short-footed lizard Acanthosaura brachypoda
Mountain horned-dragon Acanthosaura capra
Crowned spiny lizard Acanthosaura coronata
Brown pricklenape Acanthosaura lepidogaster
Murphy's agama Acanthosaura murphyi
Natalie's agama Acanthosaura nataliae
Phong Dien agama Acanthosaura phongdienensis
Short-spined agama Acanthosaura prasina
Banded japalure Diploderma fasciatum

Geckos

Adler's gecko Gekko adleri
Ba Na dwarf gecko Hemiphyllodactylus banaensis

Monitors
Clouded monitor Varanus nebulosus
Water monitor Varanus salvator

Skinks
Chinese short-limbed skink Ateuchosaurus chinensis

Snakes

Venomous
Mountain pit viper Ovophis monticola
Sharp-nosed viper Deinagkistrodon acutus
Jerdon's pit viper Protobothrops jerdonii
Brown-spotted pit-viper Protobothrops mucrosquamatus
Three-horned pit-viper Protobothrops sieversorum
Stejneger's bamboo viper Trimeresurus stejnegeri
Ruby-eyed pit-viper Trimeresurus rubeus
White-lipped pit-viper Trimeresurus albolabris
King Cobra Ophiophagus hannah
Monocled cobra Naja kaouthia
Indochinese spitting cobra Naja siamensis
Chinese cobra Naja atra

Non-venomous
Reticulated python
Burmese python
Red-tailed green ratsnake

Crocodilians
Saltwater crocodile, which has been extinct in Vietnam since at least the 1980s.
Siamese crocodile which is critically endangered on the IUCN Red List and, in Vietnam, is currently only found within Cat Tien National Park, but was much more widespread historically.

Birds

Rare and little known birds have been identified such as the Edward's pheasant which was believed to be extinct, the white-winged wood duck and the white-shouldered ibis. The country lies on the east Asian flyway of Siberian birds and is an important stopover for migratory waders.

According to the BirdLife International records of 2011, the avifauna recorded are of 889 species, which includes 18 endemic species, 44 globally threatened species and 6 introduced species. The globally threatened species are listed under the following three categories, excluding vulnerable category.

Near-threatened The near threatened species listed by IBA are:

Falcated duck (Anas falcata) 
Ferruginous duck  (Aythya nyroca) 
Chestnut-necklaced partridge (Arborophila charltonii) 
Siamese fireback (Lophura diardi) 
Germain's peacock-pheasant (Polyplectron germaini)
Platalea minor (Ichthyophaga humilis) 
Gray-headed fish-eagle (Ichthyophaga ichthyaetus) 
Cinereous vulture (Aegypius monachus) 
White-rumped falcon (Polihierax insignis)
Laggar falcon (Falco jugger) 
Corn crake (Crex crex)
Band-bellied crake (Porzana paykullii) 
Malaysian plover (Charadrius peronii) 
Eurasian curlew (Numenius arquata) 
Black-tailed godwit (Limosa limosa)
Asian dowitcher (Limnodromus semipalmatus) 
Black-bellied tern (Sterna acuticauda) 
Nicobar pigeon  (Caloenas nicobarica)
Blue-rumped parrot (Psittinus cyanurus)
Long-tailed parakeet (Psittacula longicauda) 
Black-bellied malkoha (Phaenicophaeus diardi)
Ward's trogon (Harpactes wardi) 
Blyth's kingfisher (Alcedo hercules)
Black hornbill (Anthracoceros malayanus) 
Great hornbill (Buceros bicornis) 
Brown hornbill (Anorrhinus austeni) 
White-crowned hornbill (Aceros comatus)
Red-collared woodpecker (Picus rabieri) 
Japanese paradise-flycatcher (Terpsiphone atrocaudata) 
Collared crow (Corvus torquatus) 
Yellow-billed nuthatch (Sitta solangiae) 
Streaked bulbul (Ixos malaccensis)  
Black-headed parrotbill (Paradoxornis margaritae) 
Rufous-rumped grassbird (Graminicola bengalensis) 
Short-tailed scimitar-babbler (Jabouilleia danjoui) 
Black-hooded laughingthrush (Garrulax milleti); 
Vietnamese cutia (Cutia legalleni) 
Scarlet-breasted flowerpecker (Prionochilus thoracicus)
Mekong wagtail (Motacilla samveasnae)
Vietnamese greenfinch (Chloris monguilloti) 
Asian golden weaver (Ploceus hypoxanthus) 

Endangered The endangered list covers the following species.

White-winged duck (Cairina scutulata)
Baer's pochard (Aythya baeri)
Scaly-sided merganser (Mergus squamatus) 
Orange-necked partridge (Arborophila davidi) 
Edwards's pheasant  (Lophura edwardsi) 
Vietnamese pheasant 
Black-faced spoonbill 
Lesser fish-eagle (Platalea minor) 
Nordmann's greenshank (Tringa guttifer) 
Collared laughingthrush (Garrulax yersini)
Gray-crowned crocias (Crocias langbianis)
Sooty babbler (Stachyris herberti)

Critically endangered The list of critically endangered species identified by IBA is given below.

Christmas Island frigatebird (Fregata andrewsi) 
White-shouldered ibis  (Pseudibis davisoni) 
Giant ibis (Pseudibis gigantea) 
White-rumped vulture  (Gyps bengalensis)
Indian vulture (Gyps indicus)
Red-headed vulture (Sarcogyps calvus) 
Bengal florican (Houbaropsis bengalensis)
Spoon-billed sandpiper (Eurynorhynchus pygmeus)

Molluscs

Marine molluscs
The marine molluscan fauna of Vietnam includes numerous species of chitons, gastropods, tusk shells, cephalopods and bivalves.

Non-marine molluscs

Vietnam's fauna of non-marine molluscs comprises various species of freshwater gastropods, freshwater bivalves and terrestrial gastropods. The terrestrial gastropod fauna is highly diverse and includes more than 850 described land snail and slug species; many species inhabit limestone karst hills.

Threats and conservation

The protected areas in Vietnam have suffered a decline over the past several decades. The reasons adduced to this situation are; the Vietnam war, deforestation, hunting, export of animals under CITES agreement which is generally violated by illegal activity due to inadequate patrolling. Illegal trade in wildlife is flourishing in Vietnam as there is great demand for these animals in China and also within the country. They have commercial value both at home and abroad 

Trade in wildlife resources in Vietnam is of considerable value. In respect of faunal species, trade varies between 3,700 and 4,500 tons; the use of faunal species are also for medical purposes, pets, and as food and ornamentation but excludes trade in aquatic species. Insects are also a valuable source of trade with Coleopterus and Lepidoptera species contributing towards a major share. Medicinal plants are also harvested and its trade is of the order of 20,000 tons.

Continuous conservation efforts by the Government of Vietnam have brought more and more areas under protected status. Logging operations have been banned. The conservation efforts are showing positive results with wildlife becoming re-established in many reforested areas. Mangrove forest areas are on the rise due to renewed planting. Fish fauna and crustaceans are proliferating and birds are seen more frequently. As a result of conservation efforts, Siamese crocodile numbers have recovered on account of their reintroduction to ponds within the parks.

See also
Protected areas of Vietnam
List of fauna of Hà Giang
List of amphibians of Hoàng Liên National Park

References

Bibliography

.
Environment of Vietnam
Natural history of Vietnam
Vietnam